Carex aztecica is a species of flowering plant in the sedge family, Cyperaceae. It is native to Central America.

It was originally named Carex fuscotincta by Kenneth Kent Mackenzie in 1909. However, this name was already occupied by Carex fuscotincta , so the species was renamed by Mack as Carex aztecica in 1935. Carex fuscotincta  is now considered a synonym of Carex caryophyllea.

References

aztecica
Plants described in 1909